Kilch, also spelled kilchen or kilchenfisch, is a term in German and Swiss German for these species of freshwater whitefish:

 Coregonus bavaricus
 Coregonus pidschian
 Coregonus lavaretus
 Coregonus gutturosus